Patna Sahib College of Engineering & Technology, Vaishali (PSCET) is a private university in the village of Bhagwanpur, Vaishali. It is 25 km from its district headquarters in Hajipur, and is 40 km from Bihar state capital Patna. It was established in 2011, and is run by the "Patna Sahib Group of Colleges". PSCET is affiliated with the Aryabhatta Knowledge University.

Admission 
The admission procedure for different courses is as described by the Bihar Government and Aryabhatta Knowledge University, Patna (Bihar).

See also 

 Aryabhatta Knowledge University
 Education in Bihar
 Nitish Kumar
 Education in Patna
 Hajipur

References 

Universities and colleges in Vaishali district
Colleges affiliated to Aryabhatta Knowledge University
Educational institutions established in 2011
2011 establishments in Bihar
Engineering colleges in Vaishali